Scythropites is a genus of moths of the family Yponomeutidae.

Species
Scythropites balticella - Rebel, 1935 

Yponomeutidae